Skrīveri Municipality is a former municipality in Vidzeme, Latvia. The municipality was formed in 2009 by reorganization of Skrīveri Parish; the administrative centre being Skrīveri. The population in 2020 was 3,337.

On 1 July 2021, Skrīveri Municipality ceased to exist and its territory was merged into Aizkraukle Municipality.

See also 
 Administrative divisions of Latvia (2009)

References 

 
Former municipalities of Latvia